Hemophiliac is a limited edition album of improvised experimental music by John Zorn, Ikue Mori and Mike Patton. The album was released as a limited edition 2-CD set of 2,500 copies, personally autographed by Zorn, Patton and Mori, on Zorn's Tzadik label.

Reception

The Allmusic review by Dean McFarlane awarded the album 4 stars stating "what a pity this monstrous work was not made more widely available, as it contains some of the more ferocious performances of free improvisation that the members of this trio have put to record throughout their disparate and eclectic careers."

Track listing
All compositions by Mori, Patton & Zorn

Disc One
 "Skin Eruptions" – 10:59  
 "Edema" – 15:13  
 "Stretch Marks" – 7:13  
 "The Stitch" – 1:14  
 "Malabsorption" – 8:52  
 "High Anxiety" – 11:17  
 "Dizzy Spells" – 4:02  
 "Mood Swing" – 4:16 
Disc Two 
 "Gotu Kola" – 8:33  
 "Black Kohosh" – 4:03  
 "The Squaw Vine" – 7:22  
 "Blessed Thistle" – 8:50  
 "Silymarin" – 1:56  
 "Red Clover" – 6:29  
 "Chlorophyll Enemas" – 14:17  
 "The Black Radish" – 1:53  
 "Essence of Primrose" – 3:31  
 "Dong Quai" – 7:57

Personnel
Ikue Mori – drum machines, electronics 
Mike Patton – voice, electronics 
John Zorn – alto saxophone, voice

References

2002 albums
Tzadik Records albums
Albums produced by John Zorn
Hemophiliac (band) albums